is a retired Japanese mixed martial artist and former Pancrase Bantamweight Champion. A professional competitor since 2006, he has also competed in Shooto, RIZIN, Vale Tudo Japan, DEEP, and World Victory Road.

Mixed martial arts career

Shooto
Ishiwatari made his professional MMA debut for the Shooto organization in March 2006. He fought almost exclusively for this company for four years up to 2010 and - including a fight for World Victory Road - amassed a record of 7 wins, 3 losses and 3 draws during this time.

Pancrase
Ishiwatari debuted for the Pancrase organization in 2011. In that year he won the Bantamweight King of Pancrase and remains the champion today. As of October 2017, he has a record of 12 wins, 1 loss and 1 draw with the organization.

Rizin Fighting Federation
In 2017, Ishiwatari entered into the 2017 RIZIN Bantamweight Grand Prix. He faced Akhmed Musakaev in the first round on October 15, 2017 at Rizin World Grand Prix 2017: Opening Round - Part 2. He won the fight by unanimous decision to advance.

Ishiwatari competed in the rest of the Bantamweight Grand Prix in December 2017, fighting three times over two days. In the quarter-finals, he faced Kevin Petshi on December 29, 2017 at Rizin World Grand Prix 2017: 2nd Round. He won the fight via knockout in the first round. He advanced to the next round, which was held on December 31, 2017 at Rizin World Grand Prix 2017: Final Round. He faced Takafumi Otsuka in the semi-finals and won via unanimous decision. In the final, he faced Kyoji Horiguchi and lost via knockout early into the second round.

After the Grand Prix, Ishiwatari faced Ulka Sasaki at Rizin 17 on July 28, 2019. He won the fight via north-south choke in the second round.

Ishiwatari faced Hiromasa Ougikubo in a bout that served as a title eliminator at Rizin 20 on December 31, 2019. Ishiwatari lost the back-and-forth bout via split decision.

Rizin Bantamweight Grand Prix 2021 
Ishiwatari faced Naoki Inoue in the opening round of the Bantamweight Grand Prix at Rizin 28 on June 13, 2021. He lost the bout via soccer kick knockout in the first round.

After suffering the loss in the Grand Prix, Ishiwatari announced that he was retiring from MMA, mainly due to neck injuries.

Championships and accomplishments

Mixed martial arts
Pancrase
Bantamweight King of Pancrase (One time)
Five successful title defenses
Rizin Fighting Federation
2017 RIZIN Bantamweight Grand Prix Runner Up

Mixed martial arts record

|-
|Loss
|align=center|26–9–4
|Naoki Inoue
|KO (soccer kick)
|Rizin 28
|
|align=center|1
|align=center|2:01
|Tokyo, Japan
|
|-
|Loss
|align=center|26–8–4
|Hiromasa Ougikubo
|Decision (split)
|Rizin 20
|
|align=center|3
|align=center|5:00
|Saitama, Japan
|
|-
|Win
|align=center|26–7–4
|Ulka Sasaki
|Submission (north-south choke)
|Rizin 17
|
|align=center|2
|align=center|8:58
|Saitama, Japan
|
|-
|Loss
|align=center|25–7–4
|Kyoji Horiguchi
|KO (punches)
|Rizin World Grand Prix 2017: Final Round
|
|align=center|2
|align=center|0:14
|Saitama, Japan
|2017 Rizin Bantamweight Grand-Prix Final.
|-
|Win
|align=center|25–6–4
|Takafumi Otsuka
|Decision (unanimous)
|Rizin World Grand Prix 2017: Final Round
|
| align=center| 3
| align=center| 5:00
|Saitama, Japan
|2017 Rizin Bantamweight Grand-Prix Semifinal.
|-
| Win
|align=center|24–6–4
| Kevin Petshi
| KO (punch)
| Rizin World Grand Prix 2017: 2nd Round
| 
| align=center| 1
| align=center| 4:30
| Saitama, Japan
|2017 Rizin Bantamweight Grand Prix Quarterfinal.
|-
| Win
|align=center|23–6–4
| Akhmed Musakaev
| Decision (unanimous)
| Rizin World Grand Prix 2017: Opening Round - Part 2
| 
| align=center| 3
| align=center| 5:00
| Fukuoka, Japan
|2017 Rizin Bantamweight Grand Prix Opening Round
|-
| Win
|align=center|22–6–4
| Rafael Silva
|Decision (unanimous)
|Pancrase 287
| 
|align=center|5
|align=center|5:00
| Tokyo, Japan
|
|-
| Win
| align=center| 21–6–4
| Jonathan Brookins
| Decision (unanimous)
| Pancrase 279
| 
| align=center| 3
| align=center| 5:00
| Tokyo, Japan
|
|-
| Win
| align=center| 20–6–4
| Victor Henry
| Decision (unanimous)
| Pancrase 273
| 
| align=center| 5
| align=center| 5:00
| Tokyo, Japan
| 
|-
| Win
| align=center| 19–6–4
| Takafumi Otsuka
| TKO (punch)
| DEEP: DREAM Impact 2014: Omisoka Special
| 
| align=center| 1
| align=center| 3:30
| Saitama, Japan
|
|-
| Loss
| align=center| 18–6–4
| Jonathan Brookins
| Decision (unanimous)
| Pancrase 262
| 
| align=center| 3
| align=center| 5:00
| Tokyo, Japan
| 
|-
| Win
| align=center| 18–5–4
| Trevor Ward
| TKO (corner stoppage)
| Pancrase 258
| 
| align=center| 1
| align=center| 5:00
| Tokyo, Japan
| 
|-
| Win
| align=center| 17–5–4
| Yo Saito
| Decision (unanimous)
| Pancrase 256
| 
| align=center| 3
| align=center| 5:00
| Tokyo, Japan
| 
|-
| Win
| align=center| 16–5–4
| Alan Yoshihiro Yamaniwa 
| Decision (majority)
| Pancrase 255
| 
| align=center| 3
| align=center| 5:00
| Tokyo, Japan
| 
|-
| Loss
| align=center| 15–5–4
| Kyoji Horiguchi
| TKO (punches)
| Vale Tudo Japan: VTJ 2nd
| 
| align=center| 5
| align=center| 0:41
| Tokyo, Japan
| 
|-
| Win
| align=center| 15–4–4
| Nobuhiro Yoshitake
| KO (soccer kick)
| Pancrase 246
| 
| align=center| 1
| align=center| 3:36
| Tokyo, Japan
| 
|-
| Win
| align=center| 14–4–4
| Caol Uno
| Decision (unanimous)
| Shooto: 10th Round
| 
| align=center| 3
| align=center| 5:00
| Tokyo, Japan
| 
|-
| Win
| align=center| 13–4–4
| Nobutaka Hiyoshi
| Decision (unanimous)
| Pancrase: Progress Tour 7
| 
| align=center| 2
| align=center| 5:00
| Tokyo, Japan
| 
|-
| Win
| align=center| 12–4–4
| Manabu Inoue
| Decision (majority)
| Pancrase: Impressive Tour 13
| 
| align=center| 3
| align=center| 5:00
| Tokyo, Japan
| 
|-
| Win
| align=center| 11–4–4
| Motonobu Tezuka
| Decision (split)
| Pancrase: Impressive Tour 8
| 
| align=center| 3
| align=center| 5:00
| Tokyo, Japan
| 
|-
| Draw
| align=center| 10–4–4
| Tashiro Nishiuchi
| Draw
| Pancrase: Impressive Tour 4
| 
| align=center| 3
| align=center| 5:00
| Tokyo, Japan
| 
|-
| Win
| align=center| 10–4–3
| Tashiro Nishiuchi
| Decision (unanimous)
| Pancrase: Impressive Tour 3
| 
| align=center| 3
| align=center| 5:00
| Tokyo, Japan
|  
|-
| Loss
| align=center| 9–4–3
| Taiyo Nakahara
| Decision (split)
| World Victory Road Presents: Sengoku Raiden Championships 15
| 
| align=center| 2
| align=center| 5:00
| Tokyo, Japan
| 
|-
| Win
| align=center| 9–3–3
| Kil Woo Lee
| Submission (guillotine choke)
| Sengoku Raiden Championship 14
| 
| align=center| 1
| align=center| 2:20
| Tokyo, Japan
| 
|-
| Win
| align=center| 8–3–3
| Nobuhiro Yamauchi
| TKO (punches)
| SRC ASIA vol.1
| 
| align=center| 1
| align=center| 3:13
| Tokyo, Japan
| 
|-
| Win
| align=center| 7–3–3
| Wataru Miki
| Decision (majority)
| Shooto: The Way of Shooto 3: Like a Tiger, Like a Dragon
| 
| align=center| 2
| align=center| 5:00
| Tokyo, Japan
| 
|-
| Loss
| align=center| 6–3–3
| Taiki Tsuchiya
| KO (punches)
| Shooto: Shooting Disco 9: Superman
| 
| align=center| 1
| align=center| 0:20
| Tokyo, Japan
| 
|-
| Loss
| align=center| 6–2–3
| Chan Sung Jung
| Submission (rear-naked choke)
| World Victory Road Presents: Sengoku 7
| 
| align=center| 1
| align=center| 4:29
| Tokyo, Japan
| 
|-
| Draw
| align=center| 6–1–3
| Michihiro Omigawa
| Draw 
| Shooto: Shooto Tradition 5
| 
| align=center| 2
| align=center| 5:00
| Tokyo, Japan
| 
|-
| Win
| align=center| 6–1–2
| Tenkei Oda
| TKO (punches)
| Shooto: Shooto Tradition 3
| 
| align=center| 1
| align=center| 4:08
| Tokyo, Japan
| 
|-
| Win
| align=center| 5–1–2
| Kazuhiro Ito
| KO (slam)
| Shooto: Shooting Disco 4: Born in the Fighting
| 
| align=center| 1 
| align=center| 2:17
| Tokyo, Japan
| 
|-
| Win
| align=center| 4–1–2
| Hayate Usui
| Decision (unanimous)
| Shooto: Back To Our Roots 6
| 
| align=center| 2 
| align=center| 5:00
| Tokyo, Japan
| 
|-
| Draw
| align=center| 3–1–2
| Hiroshi Nakamura
| Draw
| Shooto: Shooting Disco 2: The Heat Rises Tonight
| 
| align=center| 2 
| align=center| 5:00
| Tokyo, Japan
| 
|-
| Win
| align=center| 3–1–1
| Toshihiko Yokoyama
| TKO (punches)
| Shooto: Shooting Disco 1: Saturday Night Hero
| 
| align=center| 1
| align=center| 2:45
| Tokyo, Japan
| 
|-
| Win
| align=center| 2–1–1
| Tomonori Taniguchi
| TKO (doctor stoppage)
| Shooto: It's Strong Being a Man
| 
| align=center| 1 
| align=center| 3:41
| Tokyo, Japan
| 
|-
| Win
| align=center| 1–1–1
| Masatoshi Kobayashi
| Decision (majority)
| Shooto: 11/10 in Korakuen Hall
| 
| align=center| 2 
| align=center| 5:00
| Tokyo, Japan
| 
|-
| Draw
| align=center| 0–1–1
| Keisuke Yamada
| Draw
| Shooto 2006: 10/1 in Kitazawa Town Hall
| 
| align=center| 2 
| align=center| 5:00
| Tokyo, Japan
| 
|-
| Loss
| align=center| 0–1
| Daisuke Ishizawa
| TKO (doctor stoppage)
| Shooto: 3/3 in Kitazawa Town Hall
| 
| align=center| 2 
| align=center| 2:01
| Tokyo, Japan
| Doctor stoppage due to cut.

See also
 List of male mixed martial artists

References

External links

1985 births
Living people
Japanese male mixed martial artists
Bantamweight mixed martial artists
Mixed martial artists utilizing judo
Japanese male judoka
Sportspeople from Osaka